Araihazar is an upazila (sub-district) of the Narayanganj District in Bangladesh, part of the Dhaka Division.

Etymology
Araihazar is named after the leftover 2,500 Mughal soldiers of Man Singh I that fought with Isa Khan in the 17th century. The word for "two thousand and five hundred" in Bangla is "Araihazar" ( romanised: Araihajar), hence the name.

History
In 1921, a thana (police outpost administrative headquarters) was established in Araihazar, under the former Dhaka district. Araihazar Thana's status was upgraded to upazila (sub-district) in 1983 as part of the President of Bangladesh Hussain Muhammad Ershad's decentralisation programme.

Geography
It has 52963 households and total area 183.35 km.

Demographics
As of the 2011 Bangladesh census, Araihazar has a population of 376550. Males constitute 51.75% of the population, and females 48.25%. This Upazila's eighteen up population is 142883. Araihazar has an average literacy rate of 32% (7+ years), and the national average of 32.4% literate.

Administration
Araihazar Upazila is divided into Araihazar Municipality, Gopaldi Municipality, and ten union parishads: Bishnandi, Brahmmandi, Duptara, Fatepur, Highjadi, Kalapaharia, Kagkanda, Mahmudpur, Satgram, and Uchitpur.

See also
 Upazilas of Bangladesh
 Districts of Bangladesh
 Divisions of Bangladesh

References

 
Upazilas of Narayanganj District